Dariya Talanova (born 8 December 1995) is a Kyrgyzstani breaststroke swimmer. At the 2012 Summer Olympics, she competed in the 200 m breaststroke, finishing in 34th (last) place overall in the heats.

References

External links
 

Kyrgyzstani female breaststroke swimmers
1995 births
Living people
Sportspeople from Bishkek
Kyrgyzstani people of Russian descent
Olympic swimmers of Kyrgyzstan
Swimmers at the 2012 Summer Olympics
Swimmers at the 2016 Summer Olympics
Swimmers at the 2014 Asian Games
Asian Games competitors for Kyrgyzstan
20th-century Kyrgyzstani women
21st-century Kyrgyzstani women